Fuscopannaria siamensis is a species of lichen in the family Pannariaceae. It is found in the mountainous forests of northern Thailand and in Tamil Nadu, India, where it grows in humid habitats in association with mosses.

Taxonomy

The lichen was formally described as a new species in 2000 by lichenologists Per Magnus Jørgensen and Pat Wolseley.

Description

The marginal  are about 2 mm wide, and up to about 150 μm thick. Towards the tip, the lobes produce smaller lobules that break down somewhat to resemble soralia; this may be an adaptation to the wet growth conditions in its environment. The ascospores are colourless, lack septa, are more or less ellipsoid, and measure 18–20 by 9–10 mm.

Habitat and distribution

Fuscopannaria siamensis is muscicolous (associating with mosses), and occurs in moist forests and the light-exposed edges of evergreen savannahs. In contrast to the original type material, the Indian material did not have lobes that eroded into soralia-like areas; the author suggested that perhaps this the "normal" form of the lichen, rather than the species "which therefore unfortunately appears to have been described on an extreme form". Jørgensen suggests the lichen may have a wider subtropical distribution.

References

siamensis
Lichen species
Lichens described in 2000
Taxa named by Per Magnus Jørgensen
Lichens of Indo-China